Licor 43, or Cuarenta y Tres (Spanish for "43"), is a  Spanish liqueur, made in Cartagena, Spain.

History
It was invented in 1946 by Diego Zamora, along with his brother and sister, Angel and Josefina Zamora, and Emilio Restoy, Josefina's husband. The Licor 43 website states they based their recipe on the Liqvor Mirabilis (marvellous liquid), a golden, aromatic elixir produced and infused from local fruits and herbs in Carthago Nova during the 3rd century. Liqvor Mirabilis was encountered by the Romans when they conquered the region in 209 BC; despite the Romans banning its production and consumption, the Carthaginians continued producing in secret. This legend served as the inspiration for the Zamora's invention of Licor 43.

The name of the modern-day liqueur originates from its use of 43 different ingredients; while its recipe is a closely guarded secret by the Zamora family, it is known to contain citrus and fruit juices, and to be flavoured with vanilla, among other aromatic herbs and spices.

Commercial performance
Licor 43 is the most popular liqueur in Spain. As of 2011, it was the fastest growing premium liqueur in the world in its category, and is present in more than 60 countries. During a 2015 inquiry into the best-selling alcohols in The World's 50 Best Bars (the bar version of William Reed's The World's 50 Best Restaurants), Licor 43 was ranked as the 9th best-selling digestif worldwide. According to the International Wines and Spirits Record (IWSR), a data analytics company that tracks alcoholic beverage trends and measures country, category, and brand performance, Licor 43 was the fastest growing liquor of scale globally in 2017.

Uses and variations

Méxican carajillos specifically call for "licor del 43" as the alcohol combined with espresso and ice. In the Canary Islands, it is an essential ingredient for a Barraquito, a variant of the highly popular cortado condensada (espresso with condensed milk) coffee.

A "mini-beer" is a Licor 43 cocktail designed to visually imitate a beer. A miniature pint glass is mostly filled with Licor 43 and topped with a chilled dairy-based liquid, such as heavy cream or Irish Cream. The colour of Licor 43 mimics the amber colour of a pale beer, and the dairy product mimics the white colour of a beer's foamy head. A common cocktail variation in Mexico is the “Sandrillo” which includes Licor 43 shaken with whole milk.

References

External links
 Official website

Cartagena, Spain
Spanish liqueurs
Vanilla liqueurs